Muhammad Afsarul Ameen (born 1 January 1952) is a Awami League politician. He became the Member of Parliament for Chittagong-9 in 2008, was re-elected to the constituency (renumbered Chittagong-10) in 2014 and 2018, and was the Minister of Primary and Mass Education until 2014.

Early life 
Ameen was born on 1 January 1952. He graduated with a M.B.B.S degree.

Career 
Ameen was elected to Parliament from Chittagong-9 in 2008 as a candidate of Awami League. He received 137,106 votes while his nearest rival, Abdullah Al Noman of Bangladesh Nationalist Party, received 127,815 votes.

Ameen was elected unopposed from Chittagong-10 as a candidate of Awami League. The election was boycotted by all major political parties and Awami League got majority of the seats without elections.

Ameen was re-elected to Parliament from Chittagong-10 as a candidate of Awami League. He received 287,047 votes while his nearest rival, Abdullah Al Noman of Bangladesh Nationalist Party, received 41,390 votes.

References

Awami League politicians
Living people
Primary and Mass Education ministers of Bangladesh
1952 births
11th Jatiya Sangsad members
9th Jatiya Sangsad members
10th Jatiya Sangsad members